Timeless Passages is a best-of compilation double album by rock band Eloy, released in 2003.

Track listing

Disc one
 "Decay of Logos"  – 8:17
 "Lost?? (The Decision)"  – 5:01
 "The Midnight Fight/The Victory of Mental Force"  – 8:06
 "Master of Sensation"  – 5:59
 "Silhouette [Single Edit]"  – 3:26
 "The Bells of Notre Dame [Remix]"  – 6:18
 "Sphinx"  – 6:42
 "All Life Is One [Remix]"  – 6:27
 "Rainbow"  – 5:13
 "Point of No Return"  – 5:25
 "Ro Setau [Edit]"  – 5:00
 "Poseidon's Creation [Live München 1994]"  – 11:28

Disc two
 "Time to Turn"  – 4:31
 "End of an Odyssey"  – 9:23
 "Voyager of the Future Race"  – 6:25
 "At the Gates of Dawn"  – 4:14
 "The Tides Return Forever"  – 6:35
 "The Sun-Song"  – 4:51
 "Follow the Light [Remix]"  – 9:45
 "The Apocalypse"  – 14:52
 a) "Silent Cries Divide the Nights"
 b) "The Vision - Burning"
 c) "Force Majeure"
 "Illuminations [Remix]"  – 6:14
 "The Answer"  – 11:19

2003 greatest hits albums
Eloy (band) albums
EMI Records compilation albums